Edward James Griffiths (1891-1980) was an Australian fire fighter, veteran of the Gallipoli campaign and a three-time premiership-winning rugby league player with the Eastern Suburbs club.

Career and war service

Born in Pyrmont, New South Wales in 1891, Eddie Griffiths joined the fire service as a Brigades Cadet Corp at just sixteen years of age and his exploits since that time are legendary. Current station commander of the ‘D’ Platoon in the NSW Fire Brigade recalls Griffiths as a tough fearless man who always led by example, describing him as “Our greatest fire fighter”......”A legend in the true sense of the word”. In 1948 Griffiths was given the highest honour of any fire fighter when he was promoted to Chief Officer of the NSW Fire Brigades.

A veteran of the First World War, Griffiths, a member of an Australian artillery unit, served in Egypt and Gallipoli.

Rugby league career

Eddie Griffiths played 4 seasons with Easts and was a member of the Eastern Suburbs rugby league sides that won premierships in 1911,1912 & 1913, retaining permanent ownership of the New South Wales Rugby League‘s first trophy, the Royal Agricultural Society Shield. He played 37 first grade games with Easts between 1909 and 1912. He then joined the Western Suburbs Magpies.

Accolades

Death

Eddie Griffiths died at a nursing home at Manly on 1 November 1980, age 89. He was cremated at Northern Suburbs Crematorium on 4 Nov 1980.

References

 History Of The NSW Rugby League Finals (Steve Hadden)
 Eastern Suburbs Website

1891 births
1980 deaths
Australian firefighters
Australian rugby league players
Sydney Roosters players
Rugby league players from Sydney
Western Suburbs Magpies players
Australian military personnel of World War I